A list of railway tunnels in Jamaica.

Kingston to Montego Bay

Spanish Town to Port Antonio

May Pen to Frankfield

Bog Walk to Ewarton
None.

See also
Kingston to Montego Bay line
Spanish Town to Ewarton line
Bog Walk to Port Antonio line
May Pen to Frankfield line

References

Railway tunnels in Jamaica